In enzymology, a N-acetylneuraminate 4-O-acetyltransferase is an enzyme that catalyzes the chemical reaction

acetyl-CoA + N-acetylneuraminate  CoA + N-acetyl-4-O-acetylneuraminate

Thus, the two substrates of this enzyme are acetyl-CoA and N-acetylneuraminate, whereas its two products are CoA and N-acetyl-4-O-acetylneuraminate.

This enzyme belongs to the family of transferases, specifically those acyltransferases transferring groups other than aminoacyl groups.  The systematic name of this enzyme class is acetyl-CoA:N-acetylneuraminate 4-O-acetyltransferase. This enzyme is also called sialate O-acetyltransferase.

References 

 
 

EC 2.3.1
Enzymes of unknown structure